Bairdiidae is a family of crustaceans belonging to the order Podocopida.

Genera

Genera:
 Abrobairdia Chen, 1982
 Abyssobairdia Coles & Whatley, 1989
 Acratina Egorov, 1953

References

Podocopida